Film at Lincoln Center, previously known as the Film Society of Lincoln Center until 2019, is a film society based in New York City, United States. Founded in 1969 by three Lincoln Center executives—William F. May, Martin E. Segal and Schuyler G. Chapin—the organization spotlights American independent cinema and world cinema, and recognizes and supports new filmmakers. Film at Lincoln Center is one of the eleven resident organizations at the Lincoln Center for the Performing Arts.

Over the last four decades, Film at Lincoln Center has introduced to American audiences the works of many of the world's most acclaimed filmmakers, including François Truffaut, Rainer Werner Fassbinder, Jean-Luc Godard, Pedro Almodóvar and Martin Scorsese.

Each year the organization presents its annual Gala Tribute, honoring legendary stars and industry leaders at Lincoln Center's Alice Tully Hall.

Film at Lincoln Center also hosts the annual New York Film Festival and is a co-presenter (with the Museum of Modern Art) of the New Directors/New Films Festival. The organization also publishes the bi-monthly film journal Film Comment.

After 400 days of suspension to all physical events due to COVID-19 pandemic's limitation of social activities, Film at Lincoln Center announced on March 16, 2021, that they will reopen their theaters as of April 16, 2021.

Lesli Klainberg is currently president of Film at Lincoln Center, past executives include Rose Kuo, Mara Manus, Claudia Bonn and Joanne Koch who served as executive director from 1971 to 2003.

Eugene Hernandez is the executive director of the New York Film Festival, and Dennis Lim is the artistic director.

Past honorees of Gala Tribute
1972: Charlie Chaplin
1973: Fred Astaire
1974: Alfred Hitchcock
1975: Joanne Woodward and Paul Newman
1978: George Cukor
1979: Bob Hope
1980: John Huston
1981: Barbara Stanwyck
1982: Billy Wilder
1983: Laurence Olivier
1984: Claudette Colbert
1985: Federico Fellini
1986: Elizabeth Taylor
1987: Alec Guinness
1988: Yves Montand
1989: Bette Davis
1990: James Stewart
1991: Audrey Hepburn
1992: Gregory Peck
1993: Jack Lemmon
1994: Robert Altman
1995: Shirley MacLaine
1996: Clint Eastwood
1997: Sean Connery
1998: Martin Scorsese
1999: Mike Nichols
2000: Al Pacino
2001: Jane Fonda
2002: Francis Ford Coppola
2003: Susan Sarandon
2004: Michael Caine
2005: Dustin Hoffman
2006: Jessica Lange
2007: Diane Keaton
2008: Meryl Streep
2009: Tom Hanks
2010: Michael Douglas
2011: Sidney Poitier
2012: Catherine Deneuve
2013: Barbra Streisand
2014: Rob Reiner
2015: Robert Redford
2016: Morgan Freeman
2017: Robert De Niro
2018: Helen Mirren
2019: 50th Anniversary Gala
2020: Not awarded
2021: Spike Lee
2022: Cate Blanchett
2023: Viola Davis

References

External links
Official website

Cinema of New York City
Lincoln Center